The Women's Super-G in the 2017 FIS Alpine Skiing World Cup involved seven events, including the season final in Aspen, Colorado (USA).  Defending discipline (and overall) champion Lara Gut from Switzerland got off to a great start by winning the first three races, but she suffered a season-ending injury in early February, which led to a tight battle between the two top contenders remaining: Slovenia's Ilka Štuhec and Liechtenstein's Tina Weirather. With just the season finals in Aspen remaining, Štuhec, who had won two races in the discipline and won the season title in the downhill the day before the race, held a 15-point lead over Weirather, but Weirather nipped Štuhec by 0.35 seconds in the finals, giving her the season title by 5 points.

Weirather thus became a second-generation World Cup discipline champion, as her father Harti Weirather was World Cup downhill discipline champion in 1981 and her mother Hanni Wenzel won the overall World Cup championship twice (1978, '80). Weirather and her mother also became the first mother-daughter pair to win season trophies in the 51 years of FIS Alpine skiing World Cup competition.

The season was interrupted by the 2017 World Ski Championships, which were held from 6–20 February in St. Moritz, Switzerland. The women's Super-G was held on 7 February.

Standings

DNF = Did Not Finish
DSQ = Disqualified
DNS = Did Not Start

See also
 2017 Alpine Skiing World Cup – Women's summary rankings
 2017 Alpine Skiing World Cup – Women's Overall
 2017 Alpine Skiing World Cup – Women's Downhill
 2017 Alpine Skiing World Cup – Women's Giant Slalom
 2017 Alpine Skiing World Cup – Women's Slalom
 2017 Alpine Skiing World Cup – Women's Combined

References

External links
 Alpine Skiing at FIS website

Women's Super-G
FIS Alpine Ski World Cup women's Super-G discipline titles